The Gulf of Maine Research Institute (GMRI) is a non-profit marine science center and research institute located in Portland, Maine. The institute promotes stewarding the ecosystem, supporting sustainable seafood, cultivating science literacy, and strengthening coastal communities.

History
The organization was established as the Research Institute of the Gulf of Maine (RIGOM) in 1968 to teach young learners about Maine’s fresh and saltwater resources and to conduct research on the Gulf of Maine and its watershed.

In 1988, the organization began work to launch a public aquarium. After significant market research, an aquarium was deemed not feasible. Instead, the organization worked to build a marine research laboratory that would continue to provide science education. The  marine research and education laboratory opened in 2005. The institute established an online education program called Vital Signs for Maine school children.

Today, the endowed institute promotes ocean stewardship and economic growth in the Gulf of Maine bioregion. Science, Education and Community programs are funded primarily by federal grants and charitable contributions.

Recent accomplishments

Launched a virtual climate center to address the critical issue of climate change in the oceans
Renovated the Cohen Center for Interactive Learning and developed new climate-focused content for 5th and 6th grade students
Published the reports: "Preparing for Emerging Fisheries: An Overview of Mid-Atlantic Stocks on the Move" and "An Independent Evaluation of the Maine Limited Entry Licensing System for Lobster and Crab"
created the Gulf of Maine Responsibly Harvested brand
Expanded the Marine Resource Education Program whose goal is to:
 bring fishermen, scientists and managers together in a neutral setting outside the regulatory process
 increase the number of people at work in New England fisheries who are comfortable working with the fishery data and management systems.

References

Economy of Portland, Maine
Education in Portland, Maine
Environmental research institutes
Research institutes established in 1968